Jack Hansen (28 February 1898 – 23 February 1964) was an  Australian rules footballer who played with St Kilda in the Victorian Football League (VFL).

Notes

External links 

1898 births
1964 deaths
Australian rules footballers from Victoria (Australia)
St Kilda Football Club players